Eidy Moya (born 4 September 1974) in Barcelona, Venezuela) is a retired boxer who won world titles in the bantamweight weight division.

Early life
Moya's natural boxing skills showed early in his life when older boys persuaded him to brawl in the streets. The winner would be awarded with a Coke and Venezuelan home-made cookie named "Catalina". Moya started in boxing at age of 11 years in his native hometown Barcelona.

Amateur career
Moya won seven national championship in different divisions including two juvenile tournaments considered in equal in importance to a Golden Gloves competition.  He reportedly compiled a 179–9 record in the amateur background.

In 1992 he defeated by decision 5-0 Colombian Fernando Retayud in the Olympics box-offs that earn him a spot in Barcelona Olympic Games. 1993 was his best amateur year with Moya obtaining two gold medals in South Americans Competitions and finishing with a silver medal in the Central American games held in Puerto Rico.

Pro career
Known as "El Terrible", Moya turned pro in 1994 and defeated Saohin Srithai Condo by decision to capture the interim WBA bantamweight title in 2000.  In 2001 he beat Adan Vargas by TKO to capture the vacant WBA bantamweight title.  He lost the belt in his first defense by 9th-round KO to Johnny Bredahl in 2002, and retired in 2004 until he came out of retirement in 2017 when he drew against Oswaldo Baron and then defeated Juan Gonzalez in 2018. As of May 2021, he has no scheduled fights.

Professional boxing record

External links
 

1974 births
Bantamweight boxers
Living people
World Boxing Association champions
World bantamweight boxing champions
World boxing champions
People from Barcelona, Venezuela
Venezuelan male boxers
Competitors at the 1993 Central American and Caribbean Games
Central American and Caribbean Games silver medalists for Venezuela
Central American and Caribbean Games medalists in boxing